The NZFC 2009–10 season is the sixth season of the New Zealand Football Championship competition.

The previous season's champion, Auckland City FC, and premier Waitakere United will also be competing in the 2009–10 O-League which will run alongside the NZFC season.

Changes for 2009/10 
 Otago United will return to Carisbrook after using Sunnyvale Park as their home ground during the previous season.
 Waitakere United will now play their home fixtures at Fred Taylor Park.

Team locations

Participating clubs 

Canterbury United had initially announced in mid June they would not be competing. However they revoked their decision within two weeks and re-entered the competition. There was also hope from some parties to have a youth/reserve team for Wellington Phoenix FC to participate in the competition. However, the FIFA rules and regulations preventing a professional Australian team from competing in a New Zealand amateur competition meant this was not feasible.

The NZF has looked at including alternative teams in case any of the current eight franchises pull out. In September 2009,a syndicate from North Shore and another from Manukau were approached and asked if they could step in at late notice if one of the eight franchises withdrew.

This season is the final one in the five-year licences for each franchise and NZF are undertaking a major review of their competition structures, including the national league. Significant changes like reverting to a winter league and a club competition complete with promotion/relegation are being considered.

League table

Competition schedule 
The competition fixtures were announced on 21 September 2009

Round 1

Round 2

Round 3

Round 4

Round 5

Round 6

Round 7

Round 8

Round 9

Round 10

Round 11

Round 12

Round 13

Round 14

Finals

Semi-Finals - First Leg

Semi-Finals - Second Leg

Grand Final

References

External links 
 Official NZFC website

New Zealand Football Championship seasons
1
New
New